Casablanca Finance City (CFC) is an economic and financial hub aspiring to become a bridging platform between the north and the south. It seeks to attract and encourage international institutions and investors to invest and operate in North, West and Central Africa and to choose Casablanca as a gateway to access this region. CFC intends to build an all-encompassing ecosystem evolving around three business categories: financial companies, professional services providers and  regional or international headquarters of multinationals.

Casablanca Finance City is created under law No. 44-10 enacted in December 2010, as amended and completed by law 68-12 enacted in June 2014. The law 44-10 creates the "CFC Status” and  also entrusts Casablanca Finance City Authority with the overall management and institutional promotion of CFC. The CFC financial status is a label that gives access to an attractive package of advantages. These advantages include tax incentives, exchange control facilitation measures as well as other benefits for doing business. Companies with this status are granted to relocate into a new real estate development compound of the same name and which is based in the now-defunct Anfa Airport. By the end of 2015 a hundred groups booked their own CFC status.

Casablanca Finance City joined Global Financial Centres Index in 2014, in April 2016 CFC is rated first African financial centre and 33rd international economic hub.

References

External links
CasablancaFinanceCity.com

2010 establishments in Morocco
Law of Morocco
Casablanca